Nicole Pratt (born 5 March 1973) is a retired tennis player from Australia.

Pratt was born in Mackay, Queensland. She is the middle sibling of five children of cane farmers and was taught to play by her father, George, who was a top junior player. She attended school in Calen and received a tennis scholarship to the Australian Institute of Sport in Canberra. She turned professional at 18.

She became Australia's No. 1 ranked female player in January 2001. She won her first WTA Title at the Hyderabad Open and reached the third round of the Australian Open in 2004.

In August 2006, at age 33, Pratt reached her first ever Tier I quarterfinal at Toronto. Soon after this she rose back up into the top 100. During 2007 she was drafted by the Boston Lobsters of the WTT pro league.

At the 2008 Australian Open, after losing her first match to Nadia Petrova, a tearful Pratt announced her retirement from professional tennis. She then coached Australian female player, Casey Dellacqua; after the 2009 Australian Open, Pratt and Dellacqua decided to go different ways.

WTA career finals

Singles (1 title, 1 runner-up)

Doubles (9 titles, 4 runner-ups)

ITF finals

Singles (5–8)

Doubles (9–8)

Year-end singles ranking
 2007–70
 2006–78
 2005–127
 2004–51
 2003–53
 2002–49
 2001–52
 2000–55
 1999-58
 1998-113
 1997-102
 1996-198
 1995-297
 1994-182
 1993-204
 1992-177
 1991-241
 1990-218
 1989-447

References

External links
 
 
 
 
 

1973 births
Living people
Sportspeople from Mackay, Queensland
Australian female tennis players
Australian Open (tennis) junior champions
French Open junior champions
Hopman Cup competitors
Olympic tennis players of Australia
Sportspeople from Orlando, Florida
Tennis people from Florida
Tennis people from Queensland
Tennis players at the 2000 Summer Olympics
Tennis players at the 2004 Summer Olympics
US Open (tennis) junior champions
Australian Institute of Sport tennis players
Grand Slam (tennis) champions in girls' singles
Grand Slam (tennis) champions in girls' doubles
20th-century Australian women
21st-century Australian women